Tipula hortorum is a species of cranefly which is widespread throughout the West Palaearctic.It is a woodland species.

Identification
See

References

 

Tipulidae
Diptera of Europe
Insects described in 1758
Taxa named by Carl Linnaeus